The Venado Formation (Oir) is a geological formation of the Agua Blanca Group, in the Eastern Ranges of the Colombian Andes, cropping out along the Venado River in northern Huila.

The unit is one of the few Early Paleozoic fossiliferous formations of Colombia; many graptolites of the genus Phyllograptus have been found in the Venado Formation. The graptolites are mostly found in the silty beds and indicative of a fair weather environment on a siliciclastic shallow marine platform at the northern edge of Gondwana. The shallow sea where the Venado Formation was deposited ranged into the deeper cold Iapetus and Rheic Oceans, separating the South American continent of the time from Laurentia, Avalonia and Baltica.

Etymology 
The formation was first described by Villarroel et al. in 1997 and named after the Venado River, a left tributary of the Cabrera River.

Description 

The Venado Formation is one of few Ordovician formations outcropping in Colombia. The formation, part of the Agua Blanca Group, crops out on both banks of the Venado River in El Totumo, a vereda of the municipality Baraya in the department of Huila. The series is unconformably overlain by the Jurassic Saldaña Formation. The Venado Formation has been correlated to the contemporaneous El Hígado Formation of the Central Ranges in Tarqui.

Lithologies 
The Venado Formation comprises laminated dark grey micaceous shales, with intercalating siltstone levels and very fine sandstone beds. The shales frequently contain aggregates of pyrite. The formation is heavily folded and in a faulted contact with the Cretaceous Caballos Formation, at time of definition of the Venado Formation considered part of the Villeta Group.

Depositional environment 
The Venado Formation was deposited in a shallow marine environment, on a siliciclastic platform with persistent normal wave action with repetitive storm wave activity. Anoxic conditions of the shallow sea probably led to the deposition of pyrite. The siltstone layers contain fragmented fossils of graptolites and are probably indicative of a fair weather environment and the coarser sediments resulted from episodic and rhythmic storms.

Paleogeography 
During the Ordovician, the present-day area of northwestern South America was located in the southern temperate region. The cold Iapetus Ocean to the north of the South American terrane separated the landmass from Laurentia, most of present-day North America. The Rheic Ocean separated South America from the paleocontinents Baltica and Avalonia, that today is part of northeastern North America and northwestern Europe. North of the emerged continent of Gondwana, a shallow sea existed, bordering the Guyana and Brazilian Shields comprising the oldest crustal parts of the current South American continent. During this time in the Ordovician, Gondwana was experiencing an orogeny; the Famatinian orogeny, when the Iapetus Plate was subducting beneath Gondwana.

Fossil content 
Fossiliferous formations of the Early Paleozoic are rare in Colombia. Apart from the Venado Formation, El Hígado Formation of the Central Ranges also in Huila, has provided fossils dating to the Ordovician, the Cambrian Duda Formation of the Serranía de Macarena in Meta contains fossils of the trilobite Paradoxides, and the westernmost Ordovician unit in Colombia, La Cristalina Formation in the Central Ranges of eastern Antioquia that provided four species of Didymograptus.

The formation has provided many fossils of graptolites; the most frequently occurring genus is Phyllograptus. Additionally, Villarroel et al. (1997) reported having found Lingulella sp. and Didymograptus cf. D. artus in the formation. The latter graptolite genus fossils have been assigned rather to Acrograptus filiformis by Gutiérrez Marco in 2006.

Regional correlations

See also 
 List of fossiliferous stratigraphic units in Colombia
 Geology of the Eastern Hills
 Geology of the Altiplano Cundiboyacense
 Iscayachi Formation, contemporaneous fossiliferous formation of Bolivia
 Pircancha Formation, contemporaneous fossiliferous formation of Bolivia
 San Lorenzo Formation, contemporaneous fossiliferous formation of Bolivia
 San Juan Formation, contemporaneous fossiliferous formation of Argentina
 Great Ordovician biodiversification event

Notes

References

Bibliography

Maps

External links 
  Hallados en Colombia fósiles de hace 488 millones de años

Geologic formations of Colombia
Ordovician System of South America
Ordovician Colombia
Floian
Shale formations
Siltstone formations
Sandstone formations
Shallow marine deposits
Ordovician southern paleotemperate deposits
Paleontology in Colombia
Formations